Gijubhai Badheka (15 November 1885 – 23 June 1939) was an educator who helped to introduce Montessori education methods to India. He is referred to as "Moochhali Maa" ("mother with whiskers").  Badheka was a high court lawyer, however, following the birth of his son in 1923, he developed an interest in childhood development and education. In 1920, Badheka founded the "Bal Mandir" pre-primary school. Badheka published a number of works in the field of education including Divaswapna ("Daydreams").

Life
Badheka was born in Chittal in the Saurashtra region of western India. His given (first) name was "Girijashankar".  Badheka grew up in Bhavnagar, a city in the western Indian state of Gujarat. In 1907, he moved to East Africa and later, Bombay for work. Badheka died on 23 June 1939 in Bhavnagar, India.

Timeline 

 1885 Birth 15 November, Birth Place : Chittal Saurashtra
 1897 First Marriage with Late Hariben
 1906 Second Marriage with Late Jariben
 1907 Left for East Africa
 1909 Return to India
 1910 Law Education in Bombay (Mumbai)
 1913 High Court Pleader, Vadhwan Camp
 1913 Birth of Shri Narendra Bhai (Son)
 1915 Legal Advisor of Shri Dakshinamurti Bhavan
 1916 Associated with Dakshinamurti Vidyarthi Bhavan
 1920 Establishment of Bal Mandir
 1922 Inauguration of Bal Mandir Bhavan Near Takhteswar Bhavmandir in Bhavnagar by Kasturba Gandhi

 1925 First Montessori Conference, Bhavnagar

 1925 Establishment of Adhyapan Mandir
 1928 Second Montessori Conference, Ahmedabad (Chaired)
 1930 Living in Refugee Camps in Satyagraha Movement, Banar Parishad, Surat, Beginning of Akshargyan Yojna

 1936 Discontinued Association with Shri Dakshinamurti Vidyarthi Bhavan
 1937 - Respectfully awarded prize (Term translated from Gujrati: Samman Thailly Bheint)
 1938 Work in Gujarat; Established Last Adhyapan Mandir (Primary Teacher's college) in Rajkot
 1939 Died on 23 June, Bombay (Mumbai)

Contribution to education
In 1920, Badheka founded the Bal Mandir kindergarten. Later, Nanabhai Bhatt, Harbhai Trivedi and Badheka built the "Shree Dakshinamurti Gijubhai Vinay Mandir" school in Bhavnagar.

After the completion of his schooling, Gijubhai got admission in Shamlal’s College, but for reasons unknown, he was not able complete his studies. In 1907, he was sent to East Africa by his family to earn a living. This is where he met S.P. Stevens, a solicitor who impressed upon Gijubhai the need for self-reliance — the utter refusal to depend on anybody but yourself — and Stevens put this into practice on a daily basis in his life. It was a wonder to Gijubhai to see how Stevens made his life without banking on anyone for anything and that it was possible, in fact exhilarating, to figure things out and work single-handedly. 

On his return to India in 1910, Gijubhai studied law in Mumbai. He started his legal practice in 1911 as a district pleader and in the following year enrolled himself as a High Court pleader. On the personal front, it is believed, it was his mother’s brother, Hargovind Pandya, who inspired him. Gijubhai married twice. His first wife was Hiraben whom he married in 1902 when he was just seventeen. But Hiraben passed away young and then he married Jariben in 1906. Gijubhai became a father in 1913 when a son was born to him. Soon after his birth, when the young father picked up his little boy, for a few minutes he was sad and anxious. His own childhood flashed before his eyes. After all, like every child from a respectable family, his son too would have to go to school. And school for Gijubhai meant being caned daily for the slightest misdemeanour. As he held his newborn, Gijubhai knew that this little fellow too would have to go to school — a land of small terrors. "Wasn’t there a way out? Couldn’t there be a better way to teach and learn?" Gijubhai started asking questions. The real purpose of education, Gijubhai felt, was to have a teacher that understood the children that he/she was educating. If the child spent five or more hours with one person, five days a week, shouldn’t the child also get to love and genuinely respect the teacher? 

Gijubhai, like all parents, wanted his son to be happy, safe and comfortable all through his life. He also realised that all parents forced their kids to schools and the best schools of the time had teachers who only knew how to teach through fear. Gijubhai felt that if children are treated with respect and there are enough meaningful learning opportunities, no child would abhor coming to school. In fact, they would look forward to being in a place where there were so many children and an adult who helped them explore the world around them. Could that be possible? Gijubhai worried about it. He turned to reading and researching. This is how he stumbled upon Maria Montessori and all that she had been working on. 

All these readings taught Gijubhai the Montessori education wherein the role of an adult or a teacher is to only help unfold the hidden and inborn developmental powers of the child. The child already possesses everything. The adult is the facilitator. Maria Montessori believed that the child must be guided in the path of reaching adulthood because from the earliest moments of life children are possessed with great constructive energies that guide the formation of their mind and the coordination of their bodies.

Gijubhai devoured the book on Montessori Method. It was an introduction to another microcosm wherein teaching was done in the ‘play-way’ method. Enthused by all that he was learning, Gijubhai started spending more time with teachers and schools.  Convinced that he had to be the change, in 1915 he assisted in the establishment of Dakshinamurti (Bala Bhavan) and then started a hostel at Bhavnagar. In 1916, he gave up his legal practice and joined Dakashinamurti as assistant superintendent.  

Gijubhai’s contribution was the evolution of a system of child education suitable to Indian environment, training of teachers and creation of a body of literature for children. While liberally borrowing from the educational philosophies of Montessori, Fröbel, Dalton and others, he came up with a mixture of music, dance,  travel, storytelling and outdoor play to fit Indian requirements. Freedom and love were the twin principles around which the system revolved. The school was an instant hit. Mahatma Gandhi, who himself had clear thoughts and views on learning, was very fond of Gijubhai Badheka. It was he who called Gijubhai ‘Moochali Ma’, or mother with whiskers, and the name stayed.

Published works

Badheka published close to 200 works including storybooks. His topics include children, education, travel and humour. However, his focus was books for children, parents and educators.

See also
 List of Gujarati-language writers

References

External links
 
 

1885 births
1939 deaths
Gujarati-language writers
Gujarati people
Founders of Indian schools and colleges
Indian children's writers
Indian male writers
20th-century Indian educational theorists
People from Bhavnagar district
Recipients of the Ranjitram Suvarna Chandrak
Writers in British India
Educators in British India